Caroline Westrup (born 11 February 1986) is a Norwegian-Swedish professional golfer. She represented Sweden until she acquired Norwegian citizenship in 2015.

Early life
Westrup moved from her home of Åhus, Sweden to Bærum, Norway at age 11 after her father, Charlie Westrup, was appointed head coach of the Norwegian Golf Association. At 16 she moved to Perstorp, Sweden to attend the Swedish National Golf Gymnasium from which she graduated in 2005.

Amateur career
She majored in sport management and minored in communications at Florida State University, and recorded five wins in collegiate competition. She were a two-time NGCA All-American First Team selection (2006, 2007) and four-time All-Atlantic Coast Conference (ACC) Scholar Athlete selection (2006–09).

Westrup had a successful amateur career and was part of the Swedish national team from 2001, including the team that finished silver medalist at the 2002 European Girls' Team Championship in Turin. In 2002, she finished third at the British Girls Championship.

She was part of the winning European team at the 2003 Junior Solheim Cup, and the Swedish team winning the 2005 European Lady Junior Team Championship in the Netherlands (with a six-person team including Anna Nordqvist and Pernilla Lindberg).

Representing Sweden, Westrup was the low individual scorer at the 2006 Espirito Santo Trophy in Stellenbosch, South Africa, with a score of 8-under-par 280. The Swedish team finished tied with the host nation, but South Africa was declared the winner, since their third player had a lower score than Sweden's third player, in the third round. The initial tiebreaker, the final round non-counting score of the respective teams, was equal.

While still an amateur, Westrup finished runner-up at the 2005 Ladies Finnish Masters, her best result on the Ladies European Tour. She won the 2005 Swedish Junior Stroke-play Championship over 72 holes at Jönköping Golf Club in September, with a 3-under-par score of 277, nine strokes ahead of nearest competitor.

She finished third in the team portion of the 2007 Ladies' British Open Amateur Championship (again with Anna Nordqvist and Pernilla Lindberg).

Professional career
After turning professional in the middle of 2009, she made her professional debut at the S4C Wales Ladies Championship of Europe on the Ladies European Tour, earning her first paycheck finishing tied 40th. She played the next season mainly on the Symetra Tour in the U.S.

During her professional career, Westrups best finish on the LPGA Tour was tied 49 at the 2014 Yokohama Tire LPGA Classic and her best finish on the LET was 7th at the 2011 UniCredit Ladies German Open.

Westrup changed her citizenship to Norwegian in early 2015 in order to gain better access to sponsors and increase her chances to qualify for the 2016 Summer Olympics. Her first tournament representing Norway was the 2015 Gateway Classic near Phoenix, Arizona. She arrived in the US on her Swedish passport which unbeknownst to her automatically got cancelled once her application for Norwegian citizenship was successful. Stranded without a valid travel document she had to find her way to the Norwegian consulate in Houston to apply for a Norwegian passport. She finished the Olympic Qualifications as a reserve, losing out to Suzann Pettersen and Marianne Skarpnord.

Westrup retired in 2018, after playing on tour for eight years, and began as a golf coach at IMG Academy in Bradenton, Florida.

Amateur wins
2005 Swedish Junior Stroke-play Championship
2006 Espirito Santo Trophy (individual)

Professional wins

Symetra Tour (1)
2015 Sioux Falls GreatLIFE Challenge

Team appearances
Amateur
European Girls' Team Championship (representing Sweden): 2002, 2003
Junior Solheim Cup (representing Europe): 2003 (winners)
European Lady Juniors' Team Championship (representing Sweden): 2005 (winners)
European Ladies' Team Championship (representing Sweden): 2007, 2008 (winners)
Espirito Santo Trophy (representing Sweden): 2006 (individual winner)

References

External links

Swedish female golfers
Norwegian female golfers
Florida State Seminoles women's golfers
LPGA Tour golfers
Ladies European Tour golfers
Swedish emigrants to Norway
Naturalised citizens of Norway
Sportspeople from Skåne County
Sportspeople from Bærum
People from Kristianstad Municipality
People from Perstorp Municipality
1986 births
Living people